Robert Gibson may refer to:

Government and politics
 Robert Gibson, Lord Gibson (1886–1965), British Labour Party politician, MP
 Robert Gibson (Ontario politician) (1932–1966), Canadian politician
 Rob Gibson (born 1945), Scottish SNP politician
 Robert Murray Gibson (1869–1949), U.S. federal judge and baseball player

Religion
 Robert Atkinson Gibson (1846–1919), American bishop
 Robert W. Gibson (1854–1927), English-American ecclesiastical architect active in New York City
 Robert F. Gibson Jr. (1906–1990), bishop of Virginia in the Episcopal Church

Sports
 Robert Gibson (wrestler) (born 1958), American wrestler
 Robert Gibson (rower) (born 1986), Canadian rower
 Robert Gibson (cricketer, born 1801) (1801–1???), English cricketer
 Robert Gibson (cricketer, born 1821) (1821–1875), English cricketer
 Robert Murray Gibson (1869–1949), U.S. federal judge and baseball player

Others
 Robert Gibson (businessman) (1863–1934), Australian businessman
 Robert L. Gibson (born 1946), American naval captain and NASA astronaut
 Robert Gibson (engineer) (1928–2008), British geotechnical engineer

See also
 Bob Gibson (disambiguation)